The Murayfeg dam is a dam in Saudi Arabia opened in 1985 and located in Tayif city in Makkah region.

See also 

 List of dams in Saudi Arabia

References 

Dams in Saudi Arabia